The proposed Batoka Gorge Hydroelectric Power Station is a 2400 MW hydroelectric power station, planned for the Zambezi River on the international border between Zambia and Zimbabwe.

Location

Overview
Currently, the proposal is for two power plants, each with an installed capacity of 1200 MW; one on the Zambian side and another on the Zimbabwean side.

The project is being implemented by the Zambezi River Authority, a bi-national organisation mandated to operate, monitor and maintain the Kariba Dam complex as well as exploit the full potential of the Zambezi River.

Community resistance
As in the proposal in the 1990s that was stopped, and now again, stakeholders and the local community are strongly opposed to the dam's construction. The tourism industry generated by the current Batoka Gorge, including its whitewater rafting, employs thousands of local individuals, both directly and indirectly, and has been acknowledged as the third largest contributor to Zambia's economy. While destroying the tourism industry, the dam will also not accomplish its desired effect of providing electricity directly to the local rural population, as it will be exported to the Southern African Power Pool.

The community is also concerned about the environment. According to an article published in Zambesia, the dam could cause the river to back up to within 650 metres of Victoria Falls, a UNESCO World Heritage Site. Contravening UNESCO restrictions, this would violate the agreed-upon 12 km boundary preservation below the Falls. Consequently, both Zimbabwe and Zambia would abrogate their international legal obligations pursuant to the Convention Concerning the Protection of the World Cultural and Natural Heritage (adopted by the General Conference at its seventeenth session (Paris, 16 November 1972)). In other words, if the dam proposal moves forward, the deleterious effect is tantamount to the Victoria Falls becoming a World Heritage in Danger.

Construction costs
As of July 2018, the projected cost of development was estimated at US$4.5 billion. General Electric Africa has expressed interest in developing this power station under the design-build-operate-transfer arrangement, but with ownership reverting to Zambia and Zimbabwe, after the developers have recovered their investment plus profits.

In June 2019, Bloomberg News reported that the construction contract had been awarded to a consortium comprising General Electric of the United States and Power Construction Corporation of China (PowerChina). Construction is expected to take from ten to thirteen years.

See also

 List of power stations in Zambia
 List of power stations in Zimbabwe
 Mphanda Nkuwa Hydroelectric Power Station

References

External links
Batoka Gorge Dam

Hydroelectric power stations in Zambia
Hydroelectric power stations in Zimbabwe
Dams in Zambia
Dams in Zimbabwe
Proposed hydroelectric power stations
Proposed renewable energy power stations in Zambia
Proposed renewable energy power stations in Zimbabwe